Screamer is an unincorporated community in Henry County, Alabama, United States. The original line established between the Creek Indians and the United States in the Treaty of Fort Jackson ran through Screamer. The Treaty of Cusseta ceded the boundary line north, allowing Henry County to gain land.

References

Unincorporated communities in Henry County, Alabama
Unincorporated communities in Alabama